This is the discography for British electronic musician Photek.

Albums 
 Modus Operandi [Science, Virgin (1997)]
 Form & Function (Science, Virgin (1998)] 
 Solaris [Science, Virgin (2000)]
 Form & Function Vol. 2 [Sanctuary Records (2007)]
 KU:PALM [Photek Productions (2012)]

Singles and EPs

"Two" (Photek Productions (2012))

"One" (Photek Productions (2012))

"Acid Reign" / "M25FM" - Photek Productions, 2012 (This was a collab. release between Photek & Pinch)

"Closer" (Tectonic (2011))

"Aviator EP" (Photek Productions (2011))

"Avalanche EP" (Photek Productions (2011))

"Love & War" (Sanctuary Records (2007))

"Sidewinder (Remixes)" (Photek Productions (2005))

"Mercury" (Photek Productions (2005))

"Collision Course" (Full Cycle Records (2004))

"No Joke" (Photek Productions (2004))

"Glamourama (12")" (Science, Virgin (2000))

"Mine to Give" (Science, Virgin (2000))

"Terminus" (Science, Virgin (2000))

"The Third Sequence" (Astralwerks (1996))

"The Hidden Camera" (Science, Virgin (1996))

"T-Raenon" (Op-Art (1996))

"The Rain (Remixes)" (Razors Edge (1996))

"Ni – Ten – Ici – Ryu" (Science, Virgin (1995))

"Natural Born Killa EP" (Metalheadz (1994))

"UFO  / Rings Around Saturn" (Photek Productions (1995))

"The Seven Samurai / Complex" (Photek Productions (1995))

Remixes

Goldie "Inner City Life" - FFRR

London Elektricity - "Different Drum" - Hospital Records

Attica Blues "Blueprint" - Mo Wax

Therapy? "Loose" - A&M Records

Björk "I Miss You" - One Little Indian

Dr. Octagon "Blue Flowers" - Mo Wax

Everything But The Girl "Single" - Virgin

E-Z Rollers "Rolled Into 1" - Moving Shadow

Jonny L "2 Of Us" - XL Recordings

David Bowie "I'm Afraid Of Americans" - Virgin Records

Roni Size Reprazent "Brown Paper Bag" - Talkin' Loud

4 Hero "Star Chasers" - Talkin' Loud

Goldie "Believe" - FFRR

Lamb "Alien" - Fontana

Zero 7 "Destiny" Ultimate Dilemma

Jakatta "So Lonely" - Planetworks

Six Feet Under: Music From The HBO Original Series "Theme Tune" - Universal

Beth Orton "Anywhere" - Heavenly

James Zabiela "Sound In Motion" - Hooj Choons

The Faint "Total Job" - Astralwerks

Tubby T "Ready She Ready" - 51st State

Gwen Stefani "Cool" - Interscope

Nine Inch Nails "The Hand That Feeds" East Records

Birdy "Shelter" - Atlantic

Moby "Lie Down In Darkness" - Little Idiot

Distance "Falling" - Universal

Jess Mills "Vultures" - Island

Daft Punk "End Of Line" - Walt Disney

Karin Park "Tiger Dreams" - State Of The Eye

Chairlift "I Belong In Your Arms" - Young Turks

Rob Zombie "Living Dead Girl" - Geffen

Lana Del Rey "Ride" - Universal Music

Bob Marley & The Wailers "One Love/People Get Ready" - Island

Warren G ft Nate Dog "Regulate" Photek remix [Def Jam]

James Newton Howard "Signs" - Hollywood Records

Zella Day "Hypnotic" - Universal Music Group North America

Rodrigo y Gabriela "The Pirate That Shouldn’t Be" - Walt Disney

Film / TV Awards
ASCAP Film & Television Awards 2015
Original Score for 2014 Top Television Series
"How To Get Away With Murder"

BMI Film / TV Awards 2015
Network Television Music Awards 2015
"How To Get Away With Murder"

56th Grammy Awards (2014)
Nominated for Best Remixed Recording, Non-Classical
"One Love / People Get Ready" (Photek Remix) Bob Marley & The Wailers

55th Grammy Awards (2013)
Nominated for Best Remixed Recording, Non-Classical
"Lie Down In Darkness" (Photek Remix) Moby

54th Grammy Awards (2012)
Nominated for Best Remixed Recording, Non-Classical
"End Of Line" (Photek Remix) Daft Punk

Featured Commercial Campaigns
Johnnie Walker, "The Endless Walk" (TV Commercial)
Writer / performer: "Avalanche"

Apple Inc.  (TV Commercial)
Writer / performer: "101"

Featured Television
How To Get Away With Murder, 'Pilot' S. 1 Ep. 1 (2014) [43min] (TV Series)
[ABC / Shondaland / Nowalk Entertainment]
Composer (All Episodes) 

How To Get Away With Murder, 'It's All Her Fault' S. 1 Ep. 2 (2014) [43min] (TV Series)
[ABC / Shondaland / Nowalk Entertainment]
Composer (All Episodes) 

How To Get Away With Murder, 'Smile, or Go to Jail'  S. 1 Ep. 3 (2014) [43min] (TV Series)
[ABC / Shondaland / Nowalk Entertainment]
Composer (All Episodes) 

How To Get Away With Murder, 'Let's Get to Shopping' S. 1 Ep. 4 (2014) [43min] (TV Series)
[ABC / Shondaland / Nowalk Entertainment]
Composer (All Episodes) 

How To Get Away With Murder, 'We're Not Friends' S. 1 Ep.5 (2014) [43min] (TV Series)
[ABC / Shondaland / Nowalk Entertainment]
Composer (All Episodes) 

How To Get Away With Murder, 'Freakin' Whack-a-Mole' S. 1 Ep. 6 (2014) [43min] (TV Series)
[ABC / Shondaland / Nowalk Entertainment]
Composer (All Episodes) 

How To Get Away With Murder, 'He Deserved to Die' S. 1 Ep. 7 (2014) [43min] (TV Series)
[ABC / Shondaland / Nowalk Entertainment]
Composer (All Episodes) 

How To Get Away With Murder, 'He Has a Wife' S. 1 Ep. 8 (2014) [43min] (TV Series)
[ABC / Shondaland / Nowalk Entertainment]
Composer (All Episodes) 

How To Get Away With Murder, 'Kille Me, Kill Me, Kill Me' S. 1 Ep. 9 (2014) [43min] (TV Series)
[ABC / Shondaland / Nowalk Entertainment]
Composer (All Episodes) 

How To Get Away With Murder, 'Hello Raskolnikov' S. 1 Ep. 10 (2014) [43min] (TV Series)
[ABC / Shondaland / Nowalk Entertainment]
Composer (All Episodes) 

How To Get Away With Murder, 'Best Christmas Ever' S. 1 Ep. 11 (2014) [43min] (TV Series)
[ABC / Shondaland / Nowalk Entertainment]
Composer (All Episodes) 

How To Get Away With Murder, 'She's a Murder' S. 1 Ep. 12 (2014) [43min] (TV Series)
[ABC / Shondaland / Nowalk Entertainment]
Composer (All Episodes) 

How To Get Away With Murder, 'Mama's Here Now' S. 1 Ep. 13 (2014) [43min] (TV Series)
[ABC / Shondaland / Nowalk Entertainment]
Composer (All Episodes) 

How To Get Away With Murder, 'The Night Lila Died' S. 1 Ep. 14 [43min] (2014) (TV Series)
[ABC / Shondaland / Nowalk Entertainment]
Main Title Theme & End Title Theme

How To Get Away With Murder, 'It's All My Fault' S. 1 Ep. 15 [43min] (2014) (TV Series)
[ABC / Shondaland / Nowalk Entertainment]
Main Title Theme & End Title Theme

Gang Related (2013) [46min] (TV Series)
[20th Century FOX / Chris Morgan Productions / Imagine Entertainment]
Composer (All Episodes) 

Gang Related (2013) [46min] (TV Series)
[20th Century FOX / Chris Morgan Productions / Imagine Entertainment]
Main Title Theme & End Title Theme 

Gang Related, 'Pilot' S. 1 Ep. 1 (2014) (TV Series)
[20th Century FOX / Chris Morgan Productions / Imagine Entertainment]
Composer (All Episodes) 

Gang Related, 'Sangre por Sangre' S. 1 Ep. 2 (2014) (TV Series)
[20th Century FOX / Chris Morgan Productions / Imagine Entertainment]
Composer (All Episodes) 

Gang Related, 'Pescados Del Padre' S. 1 Ep 3 (2014) (TV Series)
[20th Century FOX / Chris Morgan Productions / Imagine Entertainment]
Composer (All Episodes) 

Gang Related, 'Perros' S. 1 Ep 4 (2014) (TV Series)
[20th Century FOX / Chris Morgan Productions / Imagine Entertainment]
Composer (All Episodes) 

Gang Related, 'Invierno Cayo' S. 1 Ep 5 (2014) (TV Series)
[20th Century FOX / Chris Morgan Productions / Imagine Entertainment]
Composer (All Episodes) 

Gang Related, 'Entre Dos Tierras' S. 1 Ep 6 (2014) (TV Series)
[20th Century FOX / Chris Morgan Productions / Imagine Entertainment]
Composer (All Episodes) 

Gang Related, "Regreso Del Infierno" S.1 Ep. 7 (2014) (TV Series)
[20th Century FOX / Chris Morgan Productions / Imagine Entertainment]
Composer (All Episodes) 

Gang Related, "El Zorro y el Gallinero" S.1 Ep. 8 (2014) (TV Series)
[20th Century FOX / Chris Morgan Productions / Imagine Entertainment]
Composer (All Episodes) 

Gang Related, "Dia de Todos los Santos" S.1 Ep. 9 (2014) (TV Series)
[20th Century FOX / Chris Morgan Productions / Imagine Entertainment]
Composer (All Episodes) 

Gang Related, "El Buey y el Alacran" S.1 Ep. 10 (2014) (TV Series)
[20th Century FOX / Chris Morgan Productions / Imagine Entertainment]
Composer (All Episodes) 

Gang Related, "La Luz Verde" S.1 Ep. 11 (2014) (TV Series)
[20th Century FOX / Chris Morgan Productions / Imagine Entertainment]
Composer (All Episodes) 

Gang Related, "Almadena" S.1 Ep. 12 (2014) (TV Series)
[20th Century FOX / Chris Morgan Productions / Imagine Entertainment]
Composer (All Episodes) 

Gang Related, "Malandros" S.1 Ep. 13 (2014) (TV Series)
[20th Century FOX / Chris Morgan Productions / Imagine Entertainment]
Composer (All Episodes) 

The Comeback (2014) (TV Series)
[HBO / Home Box Office (Subsidiary of Time Warner Cable)]

Da Vinci's Demons (2013) (TV Series)
[Starz] Trailer
Writer / performer: "Sleepwalking"

Teen Wolf (2012) (TV Series)
[MTV]
Writer / performer: "Sleepwalking" 

CSI: NY (2009) (TV Series)
[CBS]
Writer / performer: "C-Note" instrumental

CSI, "Fallen Angels" S.13 Ep.7 (2012) (TV Series)
[CBS]
Writer / performer: "Pyramid" 

CSI, "The Ripple Effect" S.8, Ep.13 (2012) (TV Series)
[CBS]
Writer / performer: "Slowburn" 

CSI: NY (YEAR) (TV Series)
[CBS]
Writer / performer: "Avalanche" 

CSI: NY, "Officer Involved" S.8 Ep.4 (2011) (TV Series)
[CBS]
Writer / performer: "Sleepwalking"

Nikita, "Alexandra" S.1 Ep.15 (2011) (TV Series)
[CBS]
Writer / performer: "This City"

Platinum (2003) (TV Series) [60min]
[American Zoetrope]
Composer: All episodes 

CSI Miami (2002) (TV Series)
[CBS]
Writer / performer: "Mine To Give"

Six Feet Under (2001) (TV Series)
[HBO]
Thomas Newman – Main Title Theme – remixer

Featured Games
Drive Club (Video Game OST)
[Sony Computer Entertainment / Evolution Studios]
"Tunnel Vision" (Hybrid) Photek remix 

Project Gotham Racing (Video game)
Writer / performer: "Junk"

Wipeout 2097 (Video game)
[Psygnosis / Sony Computer Entertainment]
Writer / performer: "The Third Sequence" "Titan"

Wipeout Pure (Video game)
[Psygnosis / Sony Computer Entertainment]
Writer / performer: "C-Note" (instrumental)

Gran Turismo 4 (Video Game)
Writer / performer "Quaman" "Rinsa" 

Need For Speed (2015) Composer

Featured Films
Tron: Legacy R3CONF1GUR3D (Soundtrack)
[Walt Disney]
"End Of Line" (Daft Punk) Photek remix

The Avengers (Soundtrack)
Evanescence "New Way To Bleed" Photek Remix
[Marvel / Hollywood Records]

Pirates of The Caribbean: On Stranger Tides (Soundtrack)
[Walt Disney]
Hans Zimmer, Rodrigo y Gabriela "The Pirate That Should Not Be" Photek remix

Glue Boys (Documentary)
Composer

Invincible [90min]
[Icon Pictures]
Composer

Under The Palms [82min]
[xFilm]
Composer

Blade [120min]
[Newline]
Writer / performer: "Ni Ten Ichi Ryu" 

City Of Industry [97min]
[Orion Pictures]
Writer / performer: "The Hidden Camera" 

Dreamland [88min]
[Echo Lake]
Composer

Stealth (Soundtrack)
[Columbia Pictures]
Writer / producer: "Bullet Proof Skin"

Stay [99min]
[Regency / 20th Century Fox]
Writer / performer: "Aleph 2" 

The Italian Job [111min]
[Paramount Pictures]
Composer: additional music

The Animatrix – Second Renaissance [10min]
[Warner Bros. Entertainment]
Composer "Ren 2"

American Wedding [96 min]
[Universal Pictures]
Composer: additional music

Dr Seuss' The Cat In The Hat [82min]
[Dreamworks]
Composer: additional music "Welcome" 

Signs (Remixes)
James Newton Howard "Signs" Photek Remix
[Blinding Edge Pictures and The Kennedy/Marshall Company / Hollywood Records]
"Signs" (James Newton Howard) Photek remix

References 

Electronic music discographies
Discographies of American artists
Discographies of British artists